5N, 5-N, or 5°N may refer to:

5N or 5°N, the 5th parallel north latitude
5N Plus Inc., Canadian metals manufacturer
 Saturn C-5N, a rocket
 Nigeria, aircraft registration code
 Aeroflot-Nord (IATA airline designator)
NJ 5N, renamed New Jersey Route 53
F-5N, a model of Northrop F-5
MP-5N, a model of Heckler & Koch MP5
SSH 5N (WA) Washington State Route 161
F4U-5N, a model of Vought F4U Corsair
F6F-5N, a model of Grumman F6F Hellcat
AD-5N, a model of Douglas A-1 Skyraider
8A-5N, a model of Northrop A-17
M-5N, a model of Suunto protractor compass
5N, a model of HP LaserJet 5
HP 5N, ISO/IEC 8859-9 (Latin 5) character set on printers by Hewlett-Packard
5N, the production code for the 1980 Doctor Who serial The Leisure Hive

See also
N5 (disambiguation)